Jethagram is a village of Gokarna Union in Nasirnagar Upazila at Brahmanbaria District under Chittagong Division of eastern Bangladesh. This village is surrounded by paddy fields, ponds, deghees and jungles. Most of the people are engaged in agriculture and fisheries. Important institutions are available here such as schools, Mosque, School of Islamic science, Temple etc. Hindus and Muslims are living together in this village from log ago.

Demographics
According to the 2011 Bangladesh census, Jathagram had 822 households and a population of 4,427.

Education
'Jethagram High School' is at the middle of the village following education standard under Comilla Board. 'Jethagram Primary School' and 'Jethagram Hafizia Madrasha' is at the east and educating the villagers. There are a lot of mosques helping by the common roll of Islamic education.

Etymology
Jethagram derived from 'Jetha'() means uncle and 'gram'() means village in English. This village is well known for a lot of ponds. Earlier it was well known for betel leaf. Greater Jethagram included other villages - Jethagram, Shochiura, Deghar and Choarkuri.

Gallery

References

Populated places in Brahmanbaria District
Villages in Brahmanbaria District
Villages in Chittagong Division